London House may refer to:
 London House, Aldersgate Street, for about one hundred years after Restoration (1660) it was the residence of the Bishop of London
 London House (Chicago), a hotel and former  jazz club and restaurant in Chicago
 London House (Johannesburg) (built 1936), a building in the city of Johannesburg constructed by the firm of Emily and Williamson
 London House for Overseas Graduates, now Goodenough College, a postgraduate residence and educational trust in central London

Music
After Hours at the London House (1959), a live album by American jazz singer Sarah Vaughan
The London House Sessions (recorded 1961, released 1996), a live compilation album by Oscar Peterson

See also
Henry Adolphus London House, a historic home located at Pittsboro, Chatham County, North Carolina
Open House London, an event which promotes appreciation of architecture by the general public
 The name of City Hall, London during the Olympic Games, 2012